Ilancueitl (Nahuatl for "old-woman skirt") was the first queen of Tenochtitlan.

Biography
Ilancuéitl was a daughter of the then ruler of Culhuacán, Acolmiztli, and she married Acamapichtli, the first ruler of Tenochtitlan. She bore no children, so her husband took more wives.

Ilancuéitl charged herself with the education of her stepson Huitzilihuitl.

See also
List of Tenochtitlan rulers

References

External links

Tenochca nobility
Queens of Tenochtitlan

Nobility of the Americas